Tazehabad (also Romanized as Tāzehābād) is a village in Chaf Rural District, in the Central District of Langarud County, Gilan Province, Iran. At the 2006 census, its population was 169, in 44 families.

References 

Populated places in Langarud County